Jed Prentice (born 1968) is an American slalom canoeist who competed at the international level from 1986 to 1994.

He won two gold medals in the C1 team event at the ICF Canoe Slalom World Championships, earning them in 1989 and 1991.

World Cup individual podiums

References

American male canoeists
Living people
1968 births
Medalists at the ICF Canoe Slalom World Championships